Melvin Yong Yik Chye (born 1972) is a Singaporean politician, union leader and former police officer. A member of the governing People's Action Party (PAP), he has been the Member of Parliament (MP) representing Radin Mas SMC since 2020 and previously the Moulmein–Cairnhill division of Tanjong Pagar GRC between 2015 and 2020.

Prior to entering politics, Yong had served in the Singapore Police Force (SPF) between 1995 and 2015. He is currently an assistant secretary-general and director at the National Trades Union Congress (NTUC), as well as the executive secretary of the National Transport Workers' Union and United Workers of Electronics & Electrical Industries.

Education
Yong attended The Chinese High School and National Junior College before he was awarded a scholarship from the Singapore Police Force in 1992 to study at Nanyang Technological University, from which he graduated in 1995 with a Bachelor of Accountancy degree. 

He subsequently went on to complete a Master of Science degree in criminal justice at the University of Leicester in 2005.

Police career
Yong started his career in the Singapore Police Force in 1995 and retired in August 2015 with the rank of Assistant Commissioner. During his service, he held various key appointments, including deputy director (Planning & Organisation), Director (Administration & Finance), Commander of Clementi Police Division, deputy director (Operations) and Director (Public Affairs).

In 2011, Yong started the Delta League, a youth engagement programme using football to keep youths out of trouble during the June and December school holidays. In 2015, he was appointed as special adviser to the Delta League and continues to provide guidance on the development of the league.

Yong also served on the National Crime Prevention Council and the National Police Cadet Corps Council. He was also the Vice Chairman of the Police Sports Association and Vice Chairman of the POLWEL Cooperative Society.

Political career
On 19 August 2015, Yong was introduced as one of the People's Action Party (PAP) candidates to be fielded in Tanjong Pagar GRC during the 2015 general election. On 11 September 2015, the PAP team for Tanjong Pagar GRC consisting of Chan Chun Sing, Indranee Rajah, Chia Shi-Lu, Joan Pereira and Yong won with 77.7% of the total votes.

On 7 October 2015, Yong was appointed chairman of the Tanjong Pagar Town Council and an advisor to the Radin Mas Grassroots Organisation.

As a trade union-affiliated Member of Parliament, Yong delivered his maiden parliamentary speech at the debate on the President's address, focusing on the importance of tripartism as Singapore's key economic advantage.

Yong is a member of both the Transport Government Parliamentary Committee (GPC) and the Community, Culture & Youth GPC.

Other career
Yong became a People's Association grassroots leader in 2002 when he joined the newly formed Punggol Cove Residents’ Committee as a member. He later became the committee's chairman from 2005 to 2008 before stepping down to take on appointments in the Punggol North Citizens' Consultative Committee (CCC). Yong was the CCC's treasurer and secretary between 2008 and 2015.

In September 2015, Yong joined the National Trades Union Congress as Director of Industrial Relations Field.

On 1 January 2016, Yong joined the United Workers of Electronics & Electrical Industries as its deputy executive secretary and subsequently took over from Heng Chee How as the executive secretary on 1 June 2016. In 2018, Yong was elected president of the IndustriALL Singapore Council.

Yong was appointed a Member of the National Wages Council since 2016.

After a spate of lift breakdowns in late 2016, Yong wrote on the struggles of lift technicians in Singapore on the NTUC's blog Labourbeat. He subsequently became the chairman of the Lift & Escalator Sectoral Tripartite Committee to work on a Manpower Development Plan for the lift and escalator industry.

On 1 September 2017, Yong was appointed a board member of the Land Transport Authority.

Yong, along with Desmond Choo, were appointed as assistant secretaries-general of the National Trades Union Congress on 1 April 2018.

Personal life
Yong is married and has two children with his wife Connie.

References

External links
 Melvin Yong on Parliament of Singapore

1972 births
Alumni of the University of Leicester
Living people
Members of the Parliament of Singapore
Nanyang Technological University alumni
People's Action Party politicians
Singaporean police officers
Singaporean trade unionists